Shalby Hospitals is an Indian organisation which was established in Ahmedabad as a joint replacement centre in 1994 by Dr. Vikram Shah. Shalby today runs a chain of 10 multi-specialty hospitals in Ahmedabad, Surat, Indore, Vapi, Jabalpur, Jaipur and Mohali.

History
The hospital, located in Ahmedabad, was established in 1994 as a small six-bed single specialty unit that offered total knee replacement (TKR) surgery.

Shalby Hospital 
By 2007, it had become a 200-bed multi-specialty hospital. It works in 40 medical disciplines ranging from cardiology, cardiothoracic surgery, dental care, oncology and trauma to ENT.

In 2011, it acquired a 55 percent stake in the Vrundavan Hospital in Goa, which had 120 beds across two units. In 2012, Shalby acquired Krishna Hospital for an estimated Rs 75 crore, to become the biggest private corporate hospital in Ahmedabad. By 2012 the company had 450 beds in Ahmedabad.

In 2013, Shah claimed the hospital in Ahmedabad and completed an average of 30 joint replacement surgeries a day, at which point they had 705 employees.

During the period 1994–2009, the joint replacement team performed more than 20,000 TKR procedures. The length of surgical time in the hospital had been dramatically reduced from 1 hour, 20 mins per TKR to around 10–12 minutes using the "ZERO Technique" invented by Dr. Vikram Shah. Over the years, Shalby has performed over 1,00,000 Joint Replacement Surgeries.

In 2011, Shalby received the Diplomat in National Board (DNB) certificate in Orthopaedics. At the time, it was the only hospital in Gujarat to have this.

Awards
 2017- Tourism Awards :  Best Hospital for Medical Tourism of Gujarat.
 Best CSR Initiative in Healthcare Award ( Corporate Sector) by EletsTechnomedia, New Delhi.
 Shalby Hospital has won the award for 'Best Operational Excellence in Healthcare, 2011' from the Federation of Indian Chambers of Commerce & Industry (FICCI) in New Delhi.
 CNBC India Healthcare Awards in Category "Excellence in Healthcare Services" (Gujarat Ratna Award) in 2016
ICICI Lombard India Healthcare Awards 2014-15 in the Category "Best Multispecialty Hospital-Metro"
 APHI (Association of Healthcare Providers, India)" Best Patient Friendly Hospital" in 2014
 IMA Medachievers.Com Award for Valuable Contribution in Healthcare - 2014
 GIS (Gujarat Innovation Society) "Hercules Award" in 2014
 Comprehensive Orthopedic Service Provider Company of the Year (Stand-alone Hospital Category by Frost & Sullivan in 2013
 Yes Bank Business Today- "Best Small & Medium Enterprise (Category-Medium) in 2013"
 Rajiv Gandhi National Quality Award 2010 in the 'Large Scale Service Sector' category from Bureau of Standards, Ministry of Science and Technology, Govt. of India.

References

External links
 

1994 establishments in Gujarat
Hospitals established in 1994
Hospitals in Ahmedabad
Hospital networks in India
Health care companies of India